Kevin Hansen (1927−1971) was an Australian professional rugby league footballer who played in the 1940s and 1950s.

Playing career
Hansen made his debut for Western Suburbs in 1947. The following year he was a member of the Wests side which claimed their third premiership, defeating Balmain 8–5 in the grand final, with Hansen scoring the winning try.

In 1952, Hansen won his second premiership with Western Suburbs and the club's fourth as they defeated South Sydney 22–12 in the 1952 grand final. This would be the last premiership Western Suburbs would win before exiting the competition in 1999. Hansen played three more seasons with Wests before playing a single season with Eastern Suburbs before retiring.

At representative level, Hansen played for NSW City, New South Wales and Australia.  He died in 1971 from leukemia aged 43.

References

1927 births
1971 deaths
Western Suburbs Magpies players
Sydney Roosters players
New South Wales rugby league team players
City New South Wales rugby league team players
Australian rugby league players
Rugby league players from Sydney
Rugby league props
Australia national rugby league team players
Deaths from leukemia
Deaths from cancer in New South Wales